{{Infobox film
| name           = Mahanayika
| image          = Mahanayika bengali film poster.jpg
| alt            = Mahanayika 2016 Bengali movie
| caption        = Mahanayikas Bengali film poster
| native_name      = 
| director       = Saikat Bhakat
| producer       = Ramkrishna Banerjee
| writer         = Saikat Bhakat
| screenplay     =Saikat Bhakat, Swagata Chakraborty Bhakat
| starring       = 
| narrator       = 
| music          = Nachiketa
| studio         = RKB Films
| distributor    = RKB Films
| released       = 
| runtime        = 2 hrs 13 minutes
| country        = India
| language       = Bengali
| budget         =₹ 1,00,00,000/-
}}Mahanayika''' is a 2016 Indian Bengali drama film written and directed by Saikat Bhakat, and starring Rituparna Sengupta, Indraneil Sengupta, Soumitra Chatterjee, and Saheb Chatterjee.

Production
The original working title of the film was Nayika, but the director Saikat Bhakat changed it to Mahanayika.  In January 2015, it was revealed that debutante director Saikat Bhakat had brought Rituparna Sengupta aboard her project Mahanayika'' to play the lead role of Rituparna Sengupta, and even though inspired by the life of Suchitra Sen the project would not be a biopic.

Plot
Shakuntala Sen (Rituparna Sengupta) is the princess of the glamour world. Her lover Aniruddha Mukherjee (Saheb Chatterjee) is a hero. Aniruddha's father Arindam (Soumitra Chatterjee) is the biggest producer of the film world. Shakuntala's would be father in law wants a hold on her career. Somehow Shakuntala agrees when she counts it as a question of stability of her future and decides to marry Aniruddha.

But a new crisis arises when detective officer Priyabrato Roy (Indraneil Sengupta) arrives in her life to exhume the black incidents from her past. She feels victimized and exploited by Priyobrata as he goes on revealing some bitter truths and dark secrets to her. We even see her to go to bed with Priyabrato to settle everything.  But at the end, we realise that Priyabrato doesn't exist in real but as her conscience that reminds her of her past relationships and how Rajat's love was unrequited by her. By this time, she has been sufficiently panged to break relation with Mukherjee family, only to return to work and focus on career once again.

Cast

 Rituparna Sengupta as Shakuntala Sen
 Indraneil Sengupta as Priyabrato Roy
 Soumitra Chatterjee as Arindam Mukherjee
 Saheb Chatterjee as Aniruddha Mukherjee
 Chandan Sen
 Sudipa Basu

Soundtrack 
The album containing 9 songs is created by Nachiketa and Rabindranath Tagore. The lyrics are penned by Nachiketa and Rabindranath Tagore. The music is distributed by Assure Digital Services Pvt. Ltd.

Reception

References

Indian drama films
Films based on biographies
Bengali-language Indian films
2010s Bengali-language films
Films scored by Rabindranath Tagore
Films scored by Nachiketa Chakraborty